Baron James Gustave Jules Alain de Rothschild (7 January 1910 – 17 October 1982) was a French banker and philanthropist.

Early life
Alain de Rothschild was born on 7 January 1910 in Paris, France. His father was Baron Robert de Rothschild, who was a banker. His mother was Gabrielle Nelly Régine Beer. He was a member of the Rothschild family.

Alain de Rothschild studied at the École libre des Sciences politiques where he graduated in 1931.

During World War II, he was sent to a detention camp.

Career
He started his career at Rothschild Freres, later known as Banque Rothschild, a family investment bank, in 1946. He owned 25%.

He was the Chairman of the Investment Society of the North, the Society of Petroleum Investors, the Company of the North and the Discount Bank of France, all of which are owned by the Rothschild family.  

He was a co-owner of Château Lafite Rothschild, a wine estate in Pauillac which produces Bordeaux wine.

Philanthropy
He served as the President of the Conservatoire de Paris from 1954 to 1982, and the French Consistory from 1967 to 1982. He served as the Chairman of the Conseil Représentatif des Institutions juives de France from 1976 to 1982. In 1973, he became president of the Fondation Rothschild. His foundation, the Institut Alain de Rothschild, was shut down in 1995.

In the aftermath of the 1980 Paris synagogue bombing, he suggested French politicians did not care about what had happened, and questioned "the inexplicable impotence" of the French police. Through the CRIF, he negotiated with President Giscard d'Estaing for increased police forces to keep synagogues safe, and set up tactics to influence the outcome of the 1981 French presidential election.

He spoke out against the Goldenberg restaurant attack, also in Paris, shortly before his death.

Honors 

 Officer of the Legion of Honour
 Croix de Guerre

Personal life
He married Mary Chauvin du Treuil on 26 January 1938. They had three children: 
 Béatrice Juliette Ruth de Rothschild (1939–), married to Armand Angliviel de la Beaumelle ( 1962,  1962) and Pierre Rosenberg ( 1981). 
 Éric de Rothschild (1940–), married to Maria-Beatrice Caracciolo Di Forino ( 1983)
 Robert de Rothschild (1947–), married to Debra Elisa Cohen ( 1999,  2001)
In 2006, his daughter Béatrice sold part of his rare books collection with the auction house Sotheby's.

Death
When President François Mitterrand was elected in 1981, Rothschild moved to New York City. A year later he died there of a heart attack on 17 October 1982 at the Lenox Hill Hospital on the Upper East Side. His funeral took place in Paris, where he was buried.

Legacy
The Fondation Rothschild – Institut Alain de Rothschild, named in his honour, funds housing for those in need as well as Jewish causes.

References

1910 births
1982 deaths
French bankers
French philanthropists
20th-century French Jews
Businesspeople from Paris
Alain